Conilepia is a monotypic moth genus in the subfamily Arctiinae erected by George Hampson in 1900. Its only species, Conilepia nigricosta, was first described by John Henry Leech in 1888. It is found in Japan and Taiwan.

References

Lithosiini
Moths of Japan
Moth genera